Steeton and Silsden railway station serves the village of Steeton and the town of Silsden in West Yorkshire, England.  It is situated closer to Steeton than to Silsden, and is on the Airedale Line.  The station, and all trains serving it, are operated by Northern.

History
Steeton & Silsden was opened by the Leeds and Bradford Extension Railway in December 1847, and was later re-sited in march 1892. The station was closed on 20 March 1965 (a victim of the Beeching Axe) but reopened in 1990. The current (staggered) station platforms built by British Rail are located on the site of the old A6068 level crossing, which was replaced by the current road bridge in 1988 as part of the Aire Valley Trunk Road project. Until its closure, both platforms were situated to the north of the former crossing, although the original station building (which survives as a private residence) was located on the Keighley side (south of the current northbound platform).

Because the station is the first station within the West Yorkshire Passenger Transport Executive subsidised ticketing region on the line into Leeds and Bradford from Skipton, there are perceived to be problems with car parking at the station, as people from outside the region drive in from North Yorkshire and Lancashire to take advantage of the subsidised ticketing. An extension to the Metro area, to include Skipton, was hoped to alleviate that when it took effect on 17 May 2009. However, the crowded car park problem still exists, so the West Yorkshire Combined Authority had plans to build a new multi-storey car park with 247 spaces by the end of 2020, costing £3.89 million. The project was delayed and construction is expected to start in April 2022, which will cost £4.63 million and deliver 245 car parking spaces.

Until recently, the station lacked full access for disabled users, which led some to catch trains in the opposite direction to change platforms. Access is now possible via a fairly steep ramp to the Leeds & Bradford-bound platform. Though the station is normally unstaffed, there are ticket machines available at the station for passengers to use. The station has digital information screens and a long-line PA system.

Services
During Monday to Saturday in the daytime and evenings there is a half-hourly service to Leeds, an hourly service to Bradford Forster Square and three trains per hour to Skipton.

On Sundays, there is an hourly service to both Leeds and Bradford Forster Square, with two trains per hour to Skipton.

The services are mostly operated by Northern Class 333 electric multiple units, but Class 331 sets are used on some weekday workings.

A limited number do stop though - two early a.m. services to Carlisle and Carnforth respectively and one afternoon Morecambe train call on weekdays and Saturdays (as do one from Lancaster and one from Ribblehead in the opposite direction), whilst on Sundays the first morning trains to each destination do so.

Services are provided by a variety of Diesel Multiple Units (of classes Class 150 and Class 158).

References

External links

Railway stations in Bradford
DfT Category F1 stations
Former Midland Railway stations
Railway stations in Great Britain opened in 1847
Railway stations in Great Britain closed in 1965
Railway stations in Great Britain opened in 1990
Reopened railway stations in Great Britain
Northern franchise railway stations
Beeching closures in England